Goin' Bananas (also known as Still Goin' Bananas) is a Philippine sketch comedy and variety show. It aired on City 2 Television (formerly BBC 2) in 1986 as "Banana Sundae" before it ended operations at the height of People Power Revolution, on IBC from 1986 to 1987 and on ABS-CBN from 1987 to 1991.

Cast

Bad Bananas
 Christopher de Leon (1986–1991)
 Edgar Mortiz (1986–1991)
 Jay Ilagan† (1986–1991)
 Johnny Delgado† (1986–1991)
 Al Tantay (1986-1991)

Featuring
 Zorayda Sanchez†
 Whitney Tyson
 Boy Derasin
 Mar Gutierrez
 Romy Santos
 Angela Luz
 Monica Herrera

See also
 Goin' Bulilit
 Banana Sundae
 List of programs broadcast by ABS-CBN
 List of programs previously broadcast by Intercontinental Broadcasting Corporation

References

1980s Philippine television series
1990s Philippine television series
1986 Philippine television series debuts
1991 Philippine television series endings
Philippine television sketch shows
ABS-CBN original programming
Intercontinental Broadcasting Corporation original programming
Filipino-language television shows